Hong Guofan (born December 1938), or Guo-Fan Hong, is a Chinese molecular biologist and professor of the Shanghai Institute of Biochemistry and Cell Biology. He served as Director of the National Center for Gene Research of the Chinese Academy of Sciences (CAS). He is an academician of the CAS and of The World Academy of Sciences.

Biography 
Hong was born in December 1938 in Ningbo, Zhejiang Province. He graduated from Fudan University in Shanghai in 1964 and worked at the Shanghai Institute of Biochemistry afterwards. On the recommendations of professors Wang Yinglai and Wang Debao, Hong became a research fellow under Nobel laureate Frederick Sanger at Cambridge University's Laboratory of Molecular Biology in 1979. He returned to China after Sanger's retirement in 1983. He was elected as an academician of the Chinese Academy of Sciences in 1997.

Hong's research is focussed on DNA and genome science. He designed the "rapid and accurate BAC-fingerprinting-anchoring strategy", which facilitated the BAC-config mapping of the rice genome. For his contributions he was awarded the Ho Leung Ho Lee Prize in life sciences.

References 

1938 births
Living people
Academics of the University of Cambridge
Biologists from Zhejiang
Chinese molecular biologists
Fudan University alumni
Members of the Chinese Academy of Sciences
Scientists from Ningbo
TWAS fellows